Hylurgus is a genus of beetles belonging to the family Curculionidae.

Species:
 Hylurgus abietiperda Dejean, 1821
 Hylurgus affinis Dejean, 1821

References

Curculionidae
Curculionidae genera